Muzha may refer to:

Muzha District, former district in Taipei
Muzha Line, medium-capacity line in Taipei, Taiwan
Muzha (mythology), a Chinese deity
Muzha (given name), a  given name in China